Trifurcula calycotomella is a moth of the family Nepticulidae. It was described by A. and Z. Laštuvka in 1997. It was described from Liguria, Italy, but is also found in Spain, France, Croatia and Greece.

The larvae feed on Calicotome spinosa.

References

Nepticulidae
Moths described in 1997
Moths of Europe